DeHaan is a concatenated form of the Dutch surname De Haan. Notable people with the surname include:

 Allyssa DeHaan (born 1988), American basketball and volleyball player
 Dane DeHaan (born 1986), American actor
 Kory DeHaan (born 1976), American baseball outfielder
 M. R. DeHaan (1891–1965), American Bible teacher